Centerville is an unincorporated community in Dodge County, Nebraska, United States. Centerville was once nominated to serve as the county seat for Dodge County; however, voters turned down the proposal in the election held September 9, 1884.

References 

Unincorporated communities in Nebraska
Unincorporated communities in Dodge County, Nebraska